Tory cave may refer to:
 Tory Cave (Albany, New York) -- a cave in the Helderberg Escarpment where a Crown Loyalist is said to have hidden during the American Revolution
 Tory's Cave (New Milford, Connecticut) -- a cave on the Housatonic Range Trail